Solnechny (masculine), Solnechnaya (feminine), or Solnechnoye (neuter) is the name of several inhabited localities in Russia:

Altai Krai
As of 2010, two rural localities in Altai Krai bear this name:
Solnechny, Altai Krai, a settlement in Zavetilyichevsky Selsoviet of Aleysky District
Solnechnoye, Altai Krai, a selo in Solnechny Selsoviet of Pervomaysky District

Amur Oblast
As of 2010, two rural localities in Amur Oblast bear this name:
Solnechny, Amur Oblast, a settlement in Solnechny Rural Settlement of Skovorodinsky District
Solnechnoye, Amur Oblast, a selo in Priozerny Rural Settlement of Ivanovsky District

Astrakhan Oblast
As of 2010, one rural locality in Astrakhan Oblast bears this name:
Solnechny, Astrakhan Oblast, a settlement in Zabuzansky Selsoviet of Krasnoyarsky District

Chelyabinsk Oblast
As of 2010, one rural locality in Chelyabinsk Oblast bears this name:
Solnechny, Chelyabinsk Oblast, a settlement in Solnechny Selsoviet of Sosnovsky District

Republic of Dagestan
As of 2010, one rural locality in the Republic of Dagestan bears this name:
Solnechnoye, Republic of Dagestan, a selo in Khasavyurtovsky District

Kaliningrad Oblast
As of 2010, three rural localities in Kaliningrad Oblast bear this name:
Solnechnoye, Bagrationovsky District, Kaliningrad Oblast, a settlement in Gvardeysky Rural Okrug of Bagrationovsky District
Solnechnoye, Guryevsky District, Kaliningrad Oblast, a settlement in Nizovsky Rural Okrug of Guryevsky District
Solnechnoye, Ozyorsky District, Kaliningrad Oblast, a settlement in Gavrilovsky Rural Okrug of Ozyorsky District

Karachay-Cherkess Republic
As of 2010, one rural locality in the Karachay-Cherkess Republic bears this name:
Solnechny, Karachay-Cherkess Republic, a settlement in Prikubansky District

Kemerovo Oblast
As of 2010, two rural localities in Kemerovo Oblast bear this name:
Solnechny, Kemerovsky District, Kemerovo Oblast, a settlement in Shcheglovskaya Rural Territory of Kemerovsky District
Solnechny, Leninsk-Kuznetsky District, Kemerovo Oblast, a settlement in Gornyatskaya Rural Territory of Leninsk-Kuznetsky District

Khabarovsk Krai
As of 2010, one urban locality in Khabarovsk Krai bears this name:
Solnechny, Khabarovsk Krai, a work settlement in Solnechny District

Republic of Khakassia
As of 2010, one rural locality in the Republic of Khakassia bears this name:
Solnechnoye, Republic of Khakassia, a selo in Solnechny Selsoviet of Ust-Abakansky District

Khanty-Mansi Autonomous Okrug
As of 2010, one rural locality in Khanty-Mansi Autonomous Okrug bears this name:
Solnechny, Khanty-Mansi Autonomous Okrug, a settlement in Surgutsky District

Komi Republic
As of 2010, one rural locality in the Komi Republic bears this name:
Solnechny, Komi Republic, a settlement under the administrative jurisdiction of Blagoyevo Urban-Type Settlement Administrative Territory in Udorsky District

Kostroma Oblast
As of 2010, two rural localities in Kostroma Oblast bear this name:
Solnechny, Krasnoselsky District, Kostroma Oblast, a settlement in Borovikovskoye Settlement of Krasnoselsky District
Solnechny, Susaninsky District, Kostroma Oblast, a settlement in Chentsovskoye Settlement of Susaninsky District

Krasnodar Krai
As of 2010, one rural locality in Krasnodar Krai bears this name:
Solnechny, Krasnodar Krai, a settlement in Obraztsovy Rural Okrug of Leningradsky District

Krasnoyarsk Krai
As of 2010, one urban locality in Krasnoyarsk Krai bears this name:
Solnechny, Krasnoyarsk Krai, a settlement; administratively incorporated as a closed administrative-territorial formation

Kurgan Oblast
As of 2010, one rural locality in Kurgan Oblast bears this name:
Solnechnaya, Kurgan Oblast, a village in Yagodninsky Selsoviet of Almenevsky District

Kursk Oblast
As of 2010, one rural locality in Kursk Oblast bears this name:
Solnechny, Kursk Oblast, a settlement in Solnechny Selsoviet of Zolotukhinsky District

Leningrad Oblast
As of 2010, one rural locality in Leningrad Oblast bears this name:
Solnechnoye, Leningrad Oblast, a settlement of the crossing in Plodovskoye Settlement Municipal Formation of Priozersky District

Mari El Republic
As of 2010, one rural locality in the Mari El Republic bears this name:
Solnechny, Mari El Republic, a settlement in Solnechny Rural Okrug of Sovetsky District

Novgorod Oblast
As of 2010, one rural locality in Novgorod Oblast bears this name:
Solnechnaya, Novgorod Oblast, a village in Volokskoye Settlement of Borovichsky District

Omsk Oblast
As of 2010, one rural locality in Omsk Oblast bears this name:
Solnechnoye, Omsk Oblast, a selo in Solnechny Rural Okrug of Russko-Polyansky District

Orenburg Oblast
As of 2010, one rural locality in Orenburg Oblast bears this name:
Solnechny, Orenburg Oblast, a settlement in Yasnopolyansky Selsoviet of Tashlinsky District

Perm Krai
As of 2013, one rural locality in Perm Krai bears this name:
Solnechny, Perm Krai, a settlement in Usolsky District

Primorsky Krai
As of 2010, one rural locality in Primorsky Krai bears this name:
Solnechnoye, Primorsky Krai, a selo in Dalnerechensky District

Rostov Oblast
As of 2010, two rural localities in Rostov Oblast bear this name:
Solnechny, Azovsky District, Rostov Oblast, a settlement in Kalinovskoye Rural Settlement of Azovsky District
Solnechny, Volgodonskoy District, Rostov Oblast, a settlement in Dobrovolskoye Rural Settlement of Volgodonskoy District

Ryazan Oblast
As of 2010, one rural locality in Ryazan Oblast bears this name:
Solnechnoye, Ryazan Oblast, a selo in Gornostayevsky Rural Okrug of Mikhaylovsky District

Saint Petersburg
As of 2010, one urban locality in Saint Petersburg bears this name:
Solnechnoye, Saint Petersburg, a settlement in Kurortny District

Sakha Republic
As of 2010, one urban locality in the Sakha Republic bears this name:
Solnechny, Sakha Republic, an urban-type settlement in Ust-Maysky District

Saratov Oblast
As of 2010, two rural localities in Saratov Oblast bear this name:
Solnechny, Fyodorovsky District, Saratov Oblast, a settlement in Fyodorovsky District
Solnechny, Marksovsky District, Saratov Oblast, a settlement in Marksovsky District

Smolensk Oblast
As of 2010, one rural locality in Smolensk Oblast bears this name:
Solnechnaya, Smolensk Oblast, a village in Repinskoye Rural Settlement of Yartsevsky District

Sverdlovsk Oblast
As of 2010, one rural locality in Sverdlovsk Oblast bears this name:
Solnechny, Sverdlovsk Oblast, a settlement under the administrative jurisdiction of the Town of Beryozovsky

Tver Oblast
As of 2010, five inhabited localities in Tver Oblast bear this name.

Urban localities
Solnechny, Tver Oblast, an urban-type settlement; administratively incorporated as an okrug, an upper-level administrative division of Tver Oblast

Rural localities
Solnechny, Bezhetsky District, Tver Oblast, a settlement in Zhitishchenskoye Rural Settlement of Bezhetsky District
Solnechny, Bologovsky District, Tver Oblast, a settlement in Berezayskoye Rural Settlement of Bologovsky District
Solnechny, Vyshnevolotsky District, Tver Oblast, a settlement in Solnechnoye Rural Settlement of Vyshnevolotsky District
Solnechnoye, Tver Oblast, a village in Molodotudskoye Rural Settlement of Oleninsky District

Udmurt Republic
As of 2010, one rural locality in the Udmurt Republic bears this name:
Solnechny, Udmurt Republic, a selo in Selychinsky Selsoviet of Yakshur-Bodyinsky District

Vologda Oblast
As of 2010, one rural locality in Vologda Oblast bears this name:
Solnechny, Vologda Oblast, a settlement in Ustyuzhensky Selsoviet of Ustyuzhensky District

Voronezh Oblast
As of 2010, one rural locality in Voronezh Oblast bears this name:
Solnechny, Voronezh Oblast, a settlement in Yamenskoye Rural Settlement of Ramonsky District

Yaroslavl Oblast
As of 2010, one rural locality in Yaroslavl Oblast bears this name:
Solnechny, Yaroslavl Oblast, a settlement in Lyubilkovsky Rural Okrug of Rostovsky District